Part XVII is a compilation of laws pertaining to the constitution of India as a country and the union of states that it is made of.  This part of the constitution consists of Articles on Official Language.

Chapter I -  Official Language of the Union

Chapter 1 covers Articles 343 and 344, and settles for two official languages of India - Hindi Which written in Devanagari script and English. It also writes that the international form of the Indian numerals should be used as the official numeral system. It also places a responsibility on the President of India to support the implementation and progressive use of Hindi, rather than English, as the official language of India, as well gives the power of imposing restrictions on the usage of English for official purposes in India. The President of India is also given a time of fifteen years, from the time of the establishing of the Constitution, to phase out English in favour of Hindi, a right yet to be exercised. The chapter also writes that a committee consisting of 30 people - 20 from the Lok Sabha (lower house) and 10 from the Rajya Sabha (upper house) should be formed ensuring that the previously mentioned responsibilities are carried out by the President.

Chapter II - Regional Languages
Chapter 2 covers articles 345–347, and writes that the regions of India are eligible to use any of the official languages of India for official purposes. It also acknowledges the possibility of a regional language being adopted and becoming an official language of India, if the President deems that a large enough proportion of the population of India desires it.

Chapter III - Language of the Supreme Court, High Courts, etc.
Chapter 3 covers articles 348 and 349, and writes that the official language of the Supreme Court of India, the High Courts of India as well as any authoritative legal texts should be English. It also acknowledges that the Governor of a State may, if authorized by the President, authorize the usage of Hindi in the previous situations.

Article 348.(2):

Chapter IV - Special Directives
Chapter 4 covers articles 350, 350A, 350B and 351. It settles that any person may submit a representation for the redress of grievances in any of the official languages of India. It also settles that the government of India should take measures to preserve the various minority language of India by building instructional facilities for teaching children at a primary level. It also writes that the President should appoint a Special Officer to ensure that these instructional facilities are built and that the previous measures are indeed carried out. Lastly, the chapter writes that the government of India should ensure the spread of Hindi, as well as promoting the enrichment and development of the language.

References

Sources

Part XVII text from wikisource

Part 17